USS LST-712 was a   built for the United States Navy during World War II.

The ship was laid down on 22 May 1944 at the Jefferson Boat & Machine Company in Jeffersonville, Indiana; launched on 7 July 1944, sponsored by Mrs. Elma Mae Goodhue, and commissioned on 2 August 1944.

Service history
During World War II, LST-712 was assigned to the Asiatic-Pacific Theater.  It participated in two operations: the invasion of Lingayen Gulf in January 1945, and the assault and occupation of Okinawa Gunto, which took place from April to June 1945. Following the war, LST-712 performed occupation duty in the Far East until mid-December 1945.

She returned to the United States and was decommissioned on 20 May 1946, and struck from the Navy List on 28 August that same year.  On 27 May 1948, the ship was sold to the Basalt Rock Company of Napa, California, and subsequently scrapped.

Awards
USS LST-712 earned two battle stars for World War II service.

References 
 

 
 

LST-542-class tank landing ships
World War II amphibious warfare vessels of the United States
Ships built in Jeffersonville, Indiana
1944 ships